Countess Lucy Christalnigg von und zu Gillitzstein, née Lucy Bellegarde, was born on 24 June 1872 in Klingenstein (now part of Blaustein) in the Kingdom of Württemberg, and died on 10 August 1914 in Srpenica, County of Gorizia and Gradisca (now in Slovenia). She was married to Count Oskar Christalnigg, a Carinthian aristocrat and Slovene patriot. 

She was one of the first female drivers in the Austro-Hungarian Monarchy, living sometimes in Klagenfurt (now in Austria) and sometimes in Gorizia (now in Italy). She was also a racing driver, winning the 1907 Wanderpreis of the Carinthian Automobile Club in an Itala car.  She became the first victim on the World War I Isonzo Front when she was shot (possibly by mistake) on 10 August 1914 at a checkpoint in Srpenica (near Bovec) while on a mission for the Red Cross.

Her story was largely forgotten, and was reconstructed in 2014 from primary sources by Nello Cristianini in the book The Last Summer. Since then, her story has been covered by television and newspapers, and in 2015 she was second in a contest organised by the Kleine Zeitung of Klagenfurt to choose the name of a new street in the town of St. Veit.

She is buried in St. Michael am Zollfeld, Austria. A monument stands on the place of her death, in Srpenica, and a documentary by TV Capodistria tells her story.

References

 The Last Summer: Story of Lucy Christalnigg and the End of a World by Nello Cristianini 
 L'ultima estate: Storia di Lucy Christalnigg e della fine di un mondo by Nello Cristianini
 Poslednje Poletje: Zgodba O Lucy Christalnigg in O Koncu Nekega Sveta by Nello Cristianini, Andreja Nastasja Terbos (Translator), 
 Der letzte Sommer: Die Geschichte von Lucy Christalnigg und vom Ende einer Welte Release Date: July 2014; 
 TV Capodistria – Istria e Dintorni, 19-4-2015. 
 Kleine Zeitung contest article
 Lucy, simbol pozabljene Gorice. Primorske Novice, 2015-08-22.

1872 births
1914 deaths
People from Alb-Donau-Kreis
People from the Kingdom of Württemberg
Austria-Hungary in World War I